Antonio Camilio Rowley (19 September 1929 – 28 April 2006) was a Welsh footballer who played in the English Football League for Liverpool and Tranmere Rovers. A centre forward, he also played for Wellington Town, Birmingham City, Stourbridge, Bangor City, Northwich Victoria and Mossley. He was capped once for Wales.

References

1929 births
2006 deaths
People from Porthcawl
Sportspeople from Bridgend County Borough
Welsh footballers
Wales international footballers
Association football forwards
Telford United F.C. players
Birmingham City F.C. players
Stourbridge F.C. players
Liverpool F.C. players
Tranmere Rovers F.C. players
Bangor City F.C. players
Northwich Victoria F.C. players
Mossley A.F.C. players
English Football League players